Hayhurum is the name given to Armenian-speaking Christians who are members of the Greek Orthodox Church. Their exact ethnicity has been a source of debate. Some (although not all) of these Armenian speakers living in the vicinity of the town of Akn till the 16th century were of Orthodox faith (instead of Armenian Apostolic Church as is the case for most Armenians). There were also a number of people of Greek Orthodox faith among Hamshenis, who are considered to have been converted to Greek Orthodoxy during the late Middle Ages under the rule of the Empire of Trebizond.

Greek Orthodox in faith and Armenian in language, they were called Hayhurums, from the Armenian words, Hay meaning Armenian, hu meaning and, and Rûm meaning Eastern Roman or, as it is now called in the West, Byzantine, denoting the state religion of the Byzantine (Eastern Roman) Empire, which was Greek Orthodoxy. Modern Greek sources seeking to integrate these refugees (forced out of Turkey in 1923) into contemporary Greek society, asserted that they were former Greek colonists who had settled in Akn and then adopted the Armenian culture and heritage of the region. Armenian sources have disputed this narrative, asserting that the Hayhurum are ethnic Armenians that converted to the state church of the Eastern Roman (Byzantine) Empire during its eight centuries of rule in Anatolia. The latter view is considered correct by most modern scholars studying the group.

Assimilation to Greek Orthodox Christianity from the Armenian Apostolic Church was a common practice among Anatolian Armenian populations during the Middle Ages, when mixed Armenian-Greek military families ruled the Byzantine Empire from Constantinople and appointed their family members to the role of Patriarch of the empire's Eastern Orthodox church. Many of the greatest Byzantine scholars, generals, clerics and emperors were of Armenian heritage and adopted the Greek Orthodox faith out of formal necessity, (as in the case of emperors and Patriarchs who had to be of the Greek Orthodox faith), or out of cosmopolitanism.

Hayhurum had a significant presence in Adapazarı where there had been an Armenian community since 1608. They were included in the 1923 agreement for Exchange of Greek and Turkish Populations between Turkey and Greece and were also forced out of Turkey and settled in various parts of Greece. Precious objects of culture belonging to this small community are displayed today in Athens at the Benaki Museum.

In the region of Agn by the 20th century Hayhurums were essentially concentrated in 5 villages: Vag, Zorak, Musaga, Sirzu, Hogus. In the region of Dersim near Çemişgezek they were found in the village of Memsa, near Pertak in the village of hromkéğ, In the region of Ilic the village of Atma was named as a Hayhorom village in 1582 but was a Kurdish village by the 20th century. In the region of Kharberd the village of Haydi and near Erzincan in the village of Dzatkéğ.

In the medieval era there were more Hayhurum villages throughout the Kemaliye, Dersim, Erzincan region but due to Islamization, depopulation from the Perso-Ottoman wars, Turkification, and migration to western Anatolia, their numbers shrank.

References

Anatolian Greeks
Armenian people by religion
Greek Orthodoxy